Aurora is an unincorporated community in Madison County, Arkansas, United States. It is located south of Huntsville at the junction of AR 127 and AR 23. The community lies on the banks of War Eagle Creek.

The first store at Aurora opened in 1874.

References

Unincorporated communities in Madison County, Arkansas
Unincorporated communities in Arkansas